Alan Jones (born 11 June 1948) is an Australian cricketer. He played in nineteen first-class and seven List A matches for Queensland between 1970 and 1977.

See also
 List of Queensland first-class cricketers

References

External links
 

1948 births
Living people
Australian cricketers
Queensland cricketers
Cricketers from Brisbane